The Youth Congress Party was a Palestinian political party that was established by Yaqub al-Ghusayn. It was formed in 1932 in the British Mandate of Palestine and quickly grew to become the largest nationalist association of the early 1930s, counting several thousand members by mid-1934 in branches across the country. The party rejected British rule and was generally pro-Husayni. 

The party's membership came mainly from Jaffa and Ramleh.

See also
 Independence Party (Mandatory Palestine)

References

Levenberg, Haim (1993). Military Preparations of the Arab Community in Palestine: 1945-1948. London: Routledge. 
A Survey of Palestine - prepared in December 1945 and January 1946 for the information of the Anglo-American Committee of Inquiry. Reprinted 1991 by The Institute of Palestine Studies, Washington. Volume II. .
1932 establishments in Mandatory Palestine
Arab nationalism in Mandatory Palestine
Arab nationalist political parties
History of Palestine (region)
Palestinian nationalist parties
Political parties established in 1932
Political parties in Mandatory Palestine
Political parties with year of disestablishment missing